XHCANQ-FM 102.7 is a noncommercial radio station in Santa Martha, Cancún, Quintana Roo, known as TurquesaPop. It is owned by Gastón Alegre Lopez, a longtime radio entrepreneur, hotel owner, and PRD politician in the state.

History
XECAN-AM 1100 took to the air in 1994.

Upon migration to FM, its call sign became XHCANQ-FM, as there is already an XHCAN-FM.

References

Radio stations in Quintana Roo